Fernando Romboli de Souza (born 4 January 1989, in Rio de Janeiro, Brazil) is a Brazilian professional tennis player. A doubles specialist, Romboli competes mainly on the ATP Challenger Tour. He reached his highest ATP singles ranking, No. 236, on 20 June 2011, and his highest ATP doubles ranking, No. 92, on 2 March 2020. He played in his first (and so far only) ATP World Tour singles match on 9 February 2010, losing to Rubén Ramírez Hidalgo in straight sets, 6–4, 6–2. Romboli won his first ATP 250 doubles title in 2021 Croatia Open alongside Spaniard David Vega Hernández defeating number 1 seed Tomislav Brkić from Bosnia and Herzegovina and Croatian Nikola Ćaćić, 6–3, 7–5, in the final.

Career

2011
In 2011 Romboli began his season at the Brazil Futures 1, losing in the second round to Ricardo Hocevar 4–6, 6–4, 1–6. He then participated in the São Paulo Challengers tournament, again losing in the round of 16, 6–3, 1–6, 1–6 to Thomas Fabbiano. Participating in the Seguros Bolívar Open Bucaramanga next, he had to enter the draw through the Qualifiers. Despite this setback, he easily beat his two qualifier opponents in straight sets to cement his spot in the main draw. He then produced the best tournament of his career, winning every match he played, dropping only three sets, and recording his first Challenger Circuit title. He then got a wildcard to enter his first ATP World Tour event, the Brasil Open, where he lost his first round match in straight sets.

2012
After testing positive to diuretics furosemide and hydrochlorothiazide, Romboli was banned for eight-and-a-half months.

ATP career finals

Doubles: 1 (1 title)

Challenger and Futures finals

Singles: 23 (14–9)

Doubles: 84 (48–36)

References

External links
 
 

Brazilian male tennis players
Sportspeople from Rio de Janeiro (city)
Living people
1989 births
Doping cases in tennis
21st-century Brazilian people